The Qadr Night or Laylat al-Qadr, variously rendered in English as the Night of Decree, Night of Power, Night of Value, Night of Destiny, or Night of Measures, is, in Islamic belief, the night when the Quran was first sent down from Heaven to the world and also the night when the first verses of the Quran were revealed to the Islamic prophet Muhammad and it is described to be better than a thousand months of worshipping. According to many Muslim sources, its exact date is uncertain but it was one of the odd-numbered nights of the last ten days of Ramadan, the ninth month of the Islamic calendar. Since that time, Muslims have regarded the last ten nights of Ramadan as being especially blessed. Muslims believe that the Night of Qadr comes with blessings and mercy of God in abundance, sins are forgiven, supplications are accepted, and that the annual decree is revealed to the angels who carry it out according to God's grace.

Naming 
Qadr, (قدر) in Arabic, means measure and limit or value of something or destiny. Some reasons have been offered for its naming:

 It is said that it was called al-Qadr because the annual destiny of every person will be determined by God.
 Some say that if one stays awake at this night praying, reading Quran, or repenting, one will reach a high state.
 Some have said that it was called al-Qadr because it is a grand and high-value night.

Other names such as "Laylat al-'Azama" (Arabic:ليلة العظمة; night of the greatness) and "Laylat al-Sharaf" (Arabic:ليلة الشرف; night of the honor) have also been mentioned for this night.

Revelation to Muhammad 
Some commentators believe that the Quran was revealed to Muhammad twice; 
the 'immediate revelation' happening on the Laylat al-Qadr and 
'gradual revelation' across 23 years.

The Quran uses the word anzal which justifies 'the immediate revelation', according to Allamah Tabatabai. However some others believe that the revelation of Quran occurred in two phases, with the first phase being the revelation in its entirety on Laylat al-Qadr to the angel Gabriel (Jibril in Arabic) in the lowest heaven, and then the subsequent verse-by-verse revelation to Muhammad by Gabriel. The revelation started in 610 CE at the Hira cave on Mount Jabal al-Nour in Mecca. The first Surah that was revealed was Sūrat al-ʿAlaq (in Arabic ). During Muhammad's first revelation, the first five verses of this Surah, or chapter, were revealed.

Date
A specific date of Laylat al-Qadr is not mentioned in the Quran. Muhammad received the information about the exact date of Laylat al-Qadr from God in a dream. He went to tell the Sahabah about that date. However, he saw two people fighting and forgot what the date was because Allah took the knowledge of Al Qadr from him. With the day of the week, a Muslim date can be fixed exactly.

Sunni Islam
Sunni Islam holds that God alone answers humanity's supplications and that He alone receives them and forgives humanity and gives them what they ask for, and that on this particular night Muslims should actively seek God's forgiveness and engage in various acts of worship.

For Muslim communities all over the world; Laylat al-Qadr is found to be on the last 5 odd nights of Ramadan (21st, 23rd, 25th, 27th or 29th) whereby night precedes day. Many cultures celebrate it on the 27th, while certain scholars state that if a Friday night coincides with an odd numbered night, it is likely to be the one.

Shia Islam 

Shia Muslims similarly believe that Laylat al-Qadr is to be found in the last ten odd nights of Ramadan but mostly on the 19th, 21st or 23rd of Ramadan with 23rd being the most important night. The 19th, according to the Shia belief, coincides with the night Ali was attacked in the Mihrab while worshipping in the Great Mosque of Kufa. He died on 21 Ramadan.

Shia Muslims believe that Ali (the first Shia Imam, and the fourth caliph of the Rashidun Caliphate to Sunnis) had special insight and intimacy with Allah on this night. Imam Sadiq is quoted as saying (Tafsir "al-Burhan", vol. 4, p. 487):Once Imam Ali was reciting Surat al-Qadr and his sons, Imam Hasan (a) and Imam Husayn (a) were near him. Imam Husayn (a) asked his father: “Father, how come we feel a different sensation when you recite this surah?” Imam Ali(a) replied, “O son of the Prophet and my son! I know things from this chapter that you are not aware of now. When this surah was sent down to the Prophet he asked me to go to him. When I went to him he recited this surah, then he put his hand on my right shoulder and said: O my brother and my successor! O the leader of my nation after me! O tireless fighter with my enemies! This surah is yours after me, and is for your two sons after you. Gabriel who is my brother among the angels informs me of the events of one year of my nation at the night of Qadr. And after me he will give this information to you. This surah will always have a shining light in your heart and in the heart of your successors until the rising of the dawn of the day of reappearance of Qa'im [the one who rises, a title for the Islamic Messiah, Mahdi]."Ibn Abbas was aware of both the date and the day of the week. Hence the Shia's have generally concluded that it is the 23rd

According to other hadiths, destinies are written on the night of Ramadan 19, are finalized on the night of Ramadan 21, and are ultimately confirmed on the night of Ramadan 23.

Two other possibilities about the time of the Night of Qadr are the nights of Ramadan 27 and Sha'ban 15.

Religious importance
The night is not comparable to any others in view of Muslims and according to a tradition, the blessings due to the acts of worship during this night cannot be equaled even by worshipping throughout an entire lifetime. The reward of acts of worship done in this one single night is more than the reward of a thousand months of worship. Laylat al-Qadr is referenced in the Quran:

Rituals (Shi'a) 
Shi'as practice the rituals of the Night of Qadr every year in mosques, tekyehs, shrines of Imams or children of Imams, Husayniyyas or their own houses. They stay vigilant the whole night until dawn and worship God. The most important practices of the Night of Qadr include congregational prayers, recitation of the Iftitah Supplication, Abu Hamza al-Thumali Supplication, and al-Jawshan al-Kabir, and collective supplications while they keep volumes of the Qur'an on top of their heads. Other rituals of the night include donations of dawn food, payment of their nadhr for the dead, feeding the poor, and emancipation of financial prisoners.

Since the assassination of  Ali (a) occurs in the last ten days of the Ramadan month, Shi'as mourn in these nights.

See also
 Predestination in Islam (Qadar)
 Ehya night
 Glossary of Islam
 Islamic calendar
 Islamic holidays
 Dehwa d-Šišlam Rabba, The Night of Power takes place during this festival in Mandaeism

References

External links
 Laylatul Qadr: The Night of Power in Islam 

Qadr
Islamic holy days
Ramadan
Islamic terminology